ALTBalaji is an Indian subscription based video on demand platform which is a wholly owned subsidiary of Balaji Telefilms Ltd. Launched on 16 April 2017, ALTBalaji is the group's foray into the digital entertainment sphere to create original OTT content.

Platforms 
ALTBalaji is an Indian content-based video-on-demand platform. ALTBalaji is available across 32 different interfaces for its viewers. The content has been made available on mobile and Tablet Devices (Apple phone, Apple iPad, Android phone, Android tablet), Web browser (Desktop Browser), Chromecast, Android TV, Apple TV, Amazon Fire TV, Roku, and Windows (Windows PC, Windows Mobile, Windows tablet). The website indicates that the platform will showcase over 250 hours of original content with a new show every month, with 32 new shows lined up in the first year, featuring India's top actors and directors. The content bank also includes 100+ hours of kids' content as well as urban regional shows in Bengali, Hindi, Marathi, Punjabi, Tamil & many more languages.

Shows
In 2022, altbalalji released only 4 shows, which was Lock Upp (Season 1), Pavitra Rishta (Season 2), Apharan (web series) (Season 2), Code M (Season 2). Their website claims the platform to be one of the largest Ott content bank seen in India, with stories genre like drama, comedy, romance, and thriller.

Controversy
An FIR has been filed against filmmaker Ekta Kapoor alleging an insult to the national emblem, Hindu gods and army personnel in ALTBalaji’s XXX (web series). Ekta’s representatives have since said that the controversial scene has been removed.

Other Entertainment

Movies
Bollywood hits with details of release year, duration, star cast, language, and genre are available on the platform. This includes hits from prominent Bollywood actors including John Abraham, Sunny Leone, Akshay Kumar, Sidharth Malhotra, Sonakshi Sinha, Emraan Hashmi and more.

See also 
 List of streaming media services
 Video on demand
 Over-the-top
 SonyLIV
 Hotstar
 Netflix
 Balaji Telefilms
 Voot

References

External links 
 Official Website

Video on demand services
Indian entertainment websites
Balaji Telefilms
Subscription video on demand services
Indian companies established in 2017
2017 establishments in Maharashtra
Mass media companies established in 2017
ALTBalaji original programming